The Gulf Road Show Starring Bob Smith was an early American prime-time variety television program which aired from 1948 to 1949 on NBC. As the title suggests, it was hosted by Buffalo Bob Smith, who was best known for hosting Howdy Doody, a popular daytime children's show of the era. It is not known how many episodes exist as kinescope recordings, however, Cab Calloway appeared as a guest in a surviving 1949 episode.

References

External links
 

1948 American television series debuts
1949 American television series endings
Black-and-white American television shows
English-language television shows
NBC original programming